Takahiro Yamaguchi (born 16 October 1936) is a Japanese weightlifter. He competed in the men's featherweight event at the 1956 Summer Olympics.

References

1936 births
Living people
Japanese male weightlifters
Olympic weightlifters of Japan
Weightlifters at the 1956 Summer Olympics
Place of birth missing (living people)